Pershing Township is one of twelve townships in Jackson County, Indiana, United States. As of the 2010 census, its population was 1,394 and it contained 628 housing units.

History
The Frank Wheeler Hotel was listed on the National Register of Historic Places in 1991.

Geography
Lakes in this township include Beck Pond, Buckskin Pond, Fox Pond and Scholl Pond. The streams of Cross Branch and Runt Run run through this township.

Unincorporated towns
 Freetown
 Spraytown

Extinct towns
 Bald Knobs

Adjacent townships
 Jackson Township, Bartholomew County (northeast)
 Hamilton Township (east)
 Brownstown Township (southeast)
 Owen Township (southwest)
 Salt Creek Township (west)
 Van Buren Township, Brown County (northwest)

Cemeteries
The township contains three cemeteries: Lucas, Spraytown and Waggoner.

Major highways
  Indiana State Road 58
  Indiana State Road 135
  Indiana State Road 258

References

External links
 Indiana Township Association
 United Township Association of Indiana
 U.S. Board on Geographic Names (GNIS)
 United States Census Bureau cartographic boundary files

Townships in Jackson County, Indiana
Townships in Indiana